The Austin Powers Collectible Card Game is an out-of-print collectible card game based on the Austin Powers franchise. The game was introduced in 1999 by Decipher, Inc., with The Spy Who Shagged Me being the only set released. This set included 140 cards based on photos, quotes, and concepts present in the Austin Powers film franchise. 

An expansion, titled International Man of Mystery, was scheduled to follow the initial release, but poor advertising and interest in the game caused the cancellation of any subsequent expansions. This game project was placed on indefinite hold by Decipher, Inc. in 2000, although the project was never officially cancelled.

References

Card games introduced in 1999
Collectible Card Game
Collectible card games
Decipher, Inc. games